The 2010–11 Vermont Catamounts men's basketball team represented the University of Vermont in the 2010–11 NCAA Division I men's basketball season. The Catamounts won their third consecutive America East Conference regular season championship but lost in the semifinals of the conference tournament to Stony Brook. The Catamounts got invited to the National Invitation Tournament but lost in the first round to Cleveland State, 63–60.

Roster

Coaches

Schedule and results

|-
!colspan=12 style=| Exhibition

|-
!colspan=12 style=| Non-conference regular season

|-
!colspan=12 style=| America East Conference regular season

|-
!colspan=9 style=| America East tournament

|-
!colspan=9 style=| NIT

References

Vermont
Vermont Catamounts men's basketball seasons
Vermont
Cat
Cat